Julio Diamante (27 December 1930 – 1 August 2020) was a Spanish film director and screenwriter. He directed ten films between 1959 and 1976. His 1965 film El arte de vivir was entered into the 15th Berlin International Film Festival. He died on 1 August 2020 in Madrid at the age of 89.

Filmography
 Organillo (1959)
 Velázquez y lo velazqueño (1961)
 La lágrima del diablo (1961)
 Tiempo de amor (1964)
 Los que no fuimos a la guerra (1965)
 El arte de vivir (1965)
 Tiempos de Chicago (1969)
 Helena y Fernanda (1970)
 Sex o no sex (1974)
 La Carmen (1976)

References

External links

1930 births
2020 deaths
Spanish film directors
Spanish male screenwriters